The Flying Ship (Russian title Летучий корабль), or The Fool of the World and the Flying Ship, is a Russian fairy tale. Andrew Lang included it in The Yellow Fairy Book and Arthur Ransome in Old Peter's Russian Tales.

Uri Shulevitz illustrated a version of Ransome's tale, The Fool of the World and the Flying Ship, for which he won the Caldecott Medal in 1969. Also, a made-for-television stop motion-animated film with the same name was released in the United Kingdom on 27 December 1990 on ITV. It aired as part of WGBH's children's series, Long Ago and Far Away. Rabbit Ears Productions also produced an audiotape version, featuring Robin Williams with music by the Klezmer Conservatory Band, which was released on Showtime in 1991. It aired as part of Rabbit Ears' series We All Have Tales. In addition, the Terry Gilliam film The Adventures of Baron Munchausen (1988) contains several elements inspired by this story, particularly the opening sequence set at the court of the Grand Turk.

Synopsis

A couple had three sons, and the youngest was a fool. One day, Czar declared that whoever made him a ship that could sail through the air would marry his daughter. The older two set out, with everything their parents could give them; then the youngest set out as well, despite their ridicule and being given less fine food. He met a little man and, when the man asked to share, he hesitated only because it was not fit. But when he opened it, the food had become fine.

The man told him how to strike a tree with an axe; then, he was not to look at it but fall to his knees. When he was lifted up, he would find the tree had been turned into a boat, and could fly it to the Tsar's palace, but he should give anyone who asked a lift. He obeyed.

On the way, he met and gave a lift to a man who was listening to everything in the world, a man who hopped on one leg so that he would not reach the end of the world in one bound, a man who could shoot a bird at a hundred miles, a man who needed a great basket of bread for his breakfast, a man whose thirst could not be sated by a lake, a man with a bundle of wood that would become soldiers, and a man with straw that would make everything cold.

At the Tsar's place, the Tsar did not want to marry the princess to a peasant. He decided to send him to the end of the world to get healing water, before the Tsar finished his dinner. But the man who could hear heard him and told the youngest son, who lamented his fate. The fleet-footed man went after it. He fell asleep by the spring, and the huntsman shot the tree he was leaning against to wake him up, and he brought back the water in time. The Tsar then ordered him to eat twelve oxen and twelve tons of bread, but the glutton ate them all. The Tsar then ordered him to drink forty casks of wine, with forty gallons each, but the thirsty man drank them all.

The Tsar said that the betrothal would be announced after the youngest son bathed, and went to have him stifled in the bath by heat. The straw cooled it, saving him.

The King demanded that he present him with an army on the spot, and with the wood, the youngest son had it and threatened to attack if the Tsar did not agree. The Tsar had him dressed in fine clothing, and the princess fell in love with him on sight. They were married, and even the glutton and the thirsty man had enough to eat and drink at the feast.

Adaption

Film
The Fool of the World and the Flying Ship was released on DVD in the United Kingdom.

See also
 The Six Servants
 How Six Made Their Way in the World
 How the Hermit helped to win the King's Daughter
 Long, Broad and Sharpsight
 The King Of Lochlin's Three Daughters
 The Griffin
 List of animated feature films
 List of stop-motion films
 The Golden Goose
 Askeladden

References

External links
 The Flying Ship Lang's version
 The Fool of the World and the Flying Ship Ransome's version
 
 The Fool and the Flying Ship Rabbit Ears's version
 The Fool of the World and the Flying Ship on YouTube, Part 1 (1990 Version)

Russian fairy tales
1990 television films
1990 films
British television films
British animated films
Cosgrove Hall Films films
1990s stop-motion animated films
British aviation films
Films set in the Russian Empire
1990s English-language films
1990s British films